Ajman University (Arabic: جامعة عجمان) was established on the 17th of June, 1988 as the first private university in the GCC. Ajman University (AU) was also the first university in the UAE to admit expatriate students under the institutional name "Ajman University College of Science and Technology," which was subsequently renamed "Ajman University of Science and Technology". In 2018, it was again renamed to "Ajman University".

Ajman University is located in the Al Jurf, area close to Khalifa Hospital in Ajman. The 215,000 square meter (2.3 million square feet) campus has sports facilities (football, basketball, track and field, swimming), a gymnasium, a bookstore, health unit, restaurants, and mosques. Its standard academic year is divided into the fall (August) and spring (January) semesters; it also has one summer semester (June). Ajman university was ranked as the top 30 universities in the Arab world and is ranked #8 in the UAE according to the 2022 QS University rankings.

Ajman University Colleges & Programs

College of Architecture, Art and Design 
 Bachelor of Science in Building Engineering & Construction Management
 Bachelor of Architecture
 Bachelor of Interior Design
 Master of Science in Urban Design

College of Business Administration
 Bachelor of Science in Management
 Bachelor of Science in Marketing
 Bachelor of Science in Finance
 Bachelor of Science in Accounting
 Master of Business Administration (Marketing)
 Master of Business Administration (Human Resource Management)
 Master of Business Administration (Financial Management)
 Doctorate of Business Administration (DBA)

College of Dentistry
 Doctor of Dental Surgery
 Master of Science in Restorative Dentistry
 Master of Science in Pediatric Dentistry
 Master of Science in Endodontics

College of Engineering and Information Technology
 Bachelor of Science in Electrical Engineering/ Electronics & Communication
 Bachelor of Science in Electrical Engineering/ Instrumentation & Control
 Bachelor of Science in Electrical Engineering/ Power & Renewable Energy
 Bachelor of Science in Civil Engineering
 Bachelor of Science in Mechanical Engineering
 Bachelor of Science in Biomedical Engineering
 Bachelor of Science in Computer Engineering
 Bachelor of Science in Information Systems/ Project Management
 Bachelor of Science in Information Systems/E- Business Management
 Bachelor of Science in Information Technology/ Networking and Security
 Bachelor of Science in Information Technology/ Databases and Web Systems
 Bachelor of Science in Data Analytics
 Master of Science in Artificial Intelligence

College of Humanities and Sciences
 Bachelor of Arts in Sociology and Social Work
 Bachelor of Arts in Psychology
 Master of Arts in Arabic Language and Literature / Literature and Criticism
 Master of Arts in Arabic Language and Literature / Language and Syntax Grammar
 Professional Diploma in Teaching

College of Law
 Bachelor of Law
 Master of Law (Private Law)
 Master of Law (Public Law)
 Doctorate of Philosophy in Law

College of Mass Communication
 Bachelor of Arts in Mass Communication / Public Relations and Advertising
 Bachelor of Arts in Mass Communication / Radio and Television
 Bachelor of Arts in Mass Communication / Print and Electronic Press
 Bachelor of Arts in Mass Communication / Graphic Design
 Master of Public Relations and Corporate Communication

College of Medicine
 Bachelor of Medicine and Bachelor of Surgery (M.B.B.S)

College of Pharmacy and Health Sciences
 Bachelor of Pharmacy
 Master of Science in Pharmacy (Clinical Pharmacy)
 Master of Science in Pharmacy (Pharmaceutical Technology)

In May 2019, Ajman University and Gulf Medical University signed a MoU to facilitate academic cooperation. The partnership is intended to foster technical cooperation, joint scientific research and dual degree programs.

Notable alumni 

 Deema Hijjawi - chef, writer and television presenter

 Tarek Shahin - Manager of Training and Continuing Education Centre at University of Science and Technology of Fujairah

References

Educational institutions established in 1988
 
Universities and colleges in the Emirate of Ajman
Technical universities and colleges
Science and technology in the United Arab Emirates
1988 establishments in the United Arab Emirates